John Chilcott (19 August 1885 – 1 July 1973) was a Welsh rugby union and professional rugby league footballer who played in the 1910s. As a Northern Union international he played in the sensational Test Match against Australia on 2 July 1914. This historic match has attained legendary status in the sport. In many ways, the 14-6 victory of the Northern Union over Australia has come to be a metaphor for the values of courage, solidarity and the ability to face adversity that characterise the game.

The name for the game was coined as a tribute to the courage of the Northern Union players, with it being compared to the battle fought at Rorke’s Drift in the Zulu War in 1879, when British troops held a post in the face of overwhelming odds. In the game the Northern Union, led by Harold Wagstaff, ended the match with only 10 players and produced an outstanding defensive display to win by 14 points to 6. Jack played club level rugby union (RU) for Ogmore Vale RFC and Cross Keys RFC, and representative level rugby league (RL) for Great Britain and Wales, and at club level for Huddersfield, as a forward (prior to the specialist positions of), during the era of contested scrums.

Playing career

International honours
Jack Chilcott won caps for Wales (RL) while at Huddersfield 1913…1914 2-caps, and won caps for Great Britain (RL) while at Huddersfield in 1914 against Australia (3 matches).

Challenge Cup Final appearances
Jack Chilcott played as a forward, i.e. number 9, in Huddersfield's 9-5 victory over Warrington in the 1912–13 Challenge Cup Final during the 1912–13 season at Headingley Rugby Stadium, Leeds on Saturday 26 April 1913, in front of a crowd of 22,754.

Genealogical information
Jack Chilcott married Eva Taylor on Thursday 16 April 1914, the marriage was registered during second ¼ 1914 in Huddersfield district.

References

External links
!Great Britain Statistics at englandrl.co.uk (statistics currently missing due to not having appeared for both Great Britain, and England)
Ogmore Vale RFC
Search for "John Chilcott" at britishnewspaperarchive.co.uk
Search for "Jack Chilcott" at britishnewspaperarchive.co.uk

1885 births
1973 deaths
Cross Keys RFC players
Footballers who switched code
Great Britain national rugby league team players
Huddersfield Giants players
Rugby league forwards
Rugby league players from Bridgend County Borough
Rugby union players from Bridgend County Borough
Wales national rugby league team players
Welsh rugby league players
Welsh rugby union players